Palau is divided into sixteen administrative regions, called states. Palau has a high ratio of government offices to citizens, with 16 states and both a tribal chiefdom and elected legislature in each state, for 20,000 people.

See also
ISO 3166-2:PW

Notes

External links
Republic of Palau – States
Honorary Consulate of the Republic of Palau to the UK &NI
Statoids

 
Subdivisions of Palau
Palau, States
Palau 1
States, Palau
Palau geography-related lists